Events in the year 1601 in the Spanish Netherlands and Prince-bishopric of Liège (predecessor states of modern Belgium).

Incumbents

Habsburg Netherlands
Sovereigns – Archdukes Albert and Isabella

Prince-Bishopric of Liège
Prince-Bishop – Ernest of Bavaria

Events
 Mark de Cooman and Frank van der Planken establish a tapestry manufactory in Oudenaarde.

January
 16 January – New regulations for trading on the Antwerp Exchange issued.

March
 20 March – New regulations on distilleries for brandy and aqua vitae issued.

April
 13 April – Export prohibition for saltpetre and gunpowder.

June
 12 June – Maurice of Nassau lays siege to Rheinberg.

July
 4 July – Archduke Albert applies to the States of Flanders, in session in Bruges, for a "half hundredth penny" (a tax of 0.5%) to finance the Siege of Ostend. 
 5 July – Siege of Ostend begins.
 10 July – Archduke Albert personally leads an assault on the defences of Ostend.
 15 July – Sir Francis Vere arrives in Ostend with reinforcements.

August
 16 August – High tides at Ostend flood trenches.

November
 2 November – Maurice of Nassau lays siege to 's-Hertogenbosch.
 22 November – Maurice of Nassau abandons the siege of 's-Hertogenbosch.

Publications
 Verhael van een tsamen-sprekinge, gehouden tusschen een courtisan oft hovelinck ende een borgere, nopende den tegenwoordighen staet van Nederlant (Leuven, Joannes Masius)
 Etienne Du Tronchet, Lettres missives et familières, avec le monologue de la Providence Divine au peuple français (Douai, Jean Bogard)
 Franciscus Costerus, Catholijcke sermoonen, op de evangelien der sondaghen vanden advent to den vasten (Antwerp, no address)
 Henricus van Cuyck, Speculum concubinariorum (Leuven, Joannes Masius)
 Justus Lipsius, Epistolarum selectarum centuria singularis ad Italos & Hispanos (Antwerp, Plantin Press)	
 Justus Lipsius, Epistolarum selectarum III. centuriae (Antwerp, Plantin Press)
 Nicolas de Montmorency, Spiritualis dulcedo quatuor libris (Leuven, Gerard Rivius)
 Antonio Ortiz, A relation of the solemnetie wherewith the Catholike princes K. Phillip the III. and Quene Margaret were receyued in the Inglish Colledge of Valladolid the 22. of August, 1600, translated by Francis Rivers (Antwerp, Arnout Coninx)
 Andres de Soto, Contemplacion del crucifixo, y consideraciones de Christo crucificado (Antwerp, Plantin Press)

Births
13 September – Jan Brueghel the Younger, painter (died 1678) 

date uncertain
 Nicolas de Liemaker, painter (died 1646)
 Frans Ykens, painter (died 1693)

Deaths
 10 May – Hans van Steenwinckel the Elder (born c. 1550), architect
 24 July – Joris Hoefnagel (born 1542), printmaker

date uncertain
 Jacobus Typotius (born 1540), humanist

References